Jerónimo de Escobar (1525 – 19 March 1593) was a Roman Catholic prelate who served as Bishop of Nicaragua (1592–1593).

Biography
Jerónimo de Escobar was born in Toledo, Spain and ordained a priest in the Order of Saint Augustine.
On 22 May 1592, he was appointed during the papacy of Pope Clement VIII as Bishop of Nicaragua and consecrated bishop on 26 July 1592 in Spain.
He served as Bishop of Nicaragua until his death on 19 March 1593 in Cadiz, Spain.

References

External links and additional sources
 (for Chronology of Bishops) 
 (for Chronology of Bishops) 

16th-century Roman Catholic bishops in Nicaragua
Bishops appointed by Pope Clement VIII
1525 births
1593 deaths
Augustinian bishops
People from Toledo, Spain
Roman Catholic bishops of León in Nicaragua